The 2022 Arizona Tennis Classic was a professional tennis tournament played on hard courts. It was the second edition of the tournament which was part of the 2022 ATP Challenger Tour. It took place in Phoenix, United States between 14 and 20 March 2022.

Denis Kudla won both the singles and doubles (with partner Treat Huey) titles, making it the first time since 2014 he swept both titles at a tennis tournament.

Singles main draw entrants

Seeds

 1 Rankings are as of 7 March 2022.

Other entrants
The following players received wildcards into the singles main draw:
  Christopher Eubanks
  Brandon Nakashima
  J. J. Wolf

The following player received entry into the singles main draw using a protected ranking:
  Fernando Verdasco

The following players received entry into the singles main draw as alternates:
  Radu Albot
  Daniel Altmaier
  Liam Broady
  Marco Cecchinato
  Denis Kudla
  Oscar Otte
  Aleksandar Vukic

The following players received entry from the qualifying draw:
  Aleksandar Kovacevic
  Mitchell Krueger
  Mikhail Kukushkin
  Emilio Nava
  Max Purcell
  Gilles Simon

The following player received entry as a lucky loser:
  Mats Moraing

Champions

Singles

  Denis Kudla def.  Daniel Altmaier 2–6, 6–2, 6–3.

Doubles

  Treat Huey /  Denis Kudla def.  Oscar Otte /  Jan-Lennard Struff 7–6(12–10), 3–6, [10–6].

References

Arizona Tennis Classic
Sports competitions in Phoenix, Arizona
2022 in American tennis
March 2022 sports events in the United States